Malva vein clearing virus also known as MVCV is a species of Potyvirus in the family Potyviridae that was isolated in 1957 from Malva sylvestris in Germany which is transmitted by the aphids Aphis umbrella and Myzus persicae.  The insects mechanically inoculate the malvaceous hosts.

Host range
Known hosts of the virus include Malva neglecta, M. nicaensis, M. parviflora, M. rotundifolia, M. sylvestris, Lavatera assurgentiflora, L. cretica, L. trimestris. In addition to the natural hosts, infection can be experimentally induced in some other species of the Malvaceae or mallow family.  MVCV causes vein clearing and yellow mosaicism.

Distribution
This virus has been reported from Tasmania, Brazil, the former Czechoslovakia, Germany, Israel, Italy, Portugal, California, Russia, the former Yugoslavia.

See also
 Malva mosaic virus

References

External links

 

vein clearing virus
Viral plant pathogens and diseases
Potyviruses